Eremias brenchleyi, commonly known as the Ordos racerunner, is a species of lizard in the family Lacertidae. The species is endemic to China.

Etymology
The specific name, brenchleyi, is in honour of English naturalist Julius Lucius Brenchley, who collected the holotype.

Geographic range
In China, E. brenchleyi is found in the provinces Anhui, Hebei, Henan, Jiangsu, Shaanxi, Shandong, and the autonomous region Inner Mongolia.

Habitat

Diet
E. brenchleyi preys upon insects.

Reproduction
E. brenchleyi is oviparous.

References

Further reading
Günther A (1872). "On some new Species of Reptiles and Fishes collected by J. Brenchley, Esq." Annals and Magazine of Natural History, Fourth Series 10: 418–426. (Eremias brenchleyi, new species, p. 419).
Sindaco R, Jeremčenko VK (2008). The Reptiles of the Western Palearctic. 1. Annotated Checklist and Distributional Atlas of the Turtles, Crocodiles, Amphisbaenians and Lizards of Europe, North Africa, Middle East and Central Asia. (Monographs of the Societas Herpetologica Italica). Latina, Italy: Edizioni Belvedere. 580 pp. . (Eremias brenchleyi, p. 225).
Zhao E, Adler K (1993). Herpetology of China. Oxford, Ohio: Society for the Study of Amphibians and Reptiles (SSAR). 522 pp. 

Eremias
Reptiles described in 1872
Endemic fauna of China
Reptiles of China
Taxa named by Albert Günther